Jon Gabrus  (born January 31, 1982) is an American actor and comedian, best known for his work on Guy Code, the podcast Comedy Bang! Bang!, and TVLand's Younger. He is a performer at the Upright Citizens Brigade Theatre and hosts the High and Mighty podcast, as well as co-hosting the Raised By TV and Action Boyz podcasts.

Early life and education
Jonathan Gabrus was born and raised in Long Island in the town of Bellmore. He attended Wellington C. Mepham High School where he was a part of the football and swim teams. Gabrus was a lifeguard in the summers during school at Field 6, Jones Beach State Park. After graduation Gabrus attended Marist College where he played club rugby. Gabrus’ admission essay was about Popeye.

Career
Jon Gabrus began performing at the Upright Citizens Brigade Theatre in New York in 2005 and currently performs at the theater in Los Angeles. At UCB, he has been a member of the teams Mailer Daemon, fwand, The Law Firm, and Your F'd Up Family. His one-person show "Blackout Drunk" also played at the theater. He has been a regular panelist for MTV2's Guy Code for five seasons and has played recurring roles on TV shows like Younger, Comedy Bang! Bang!, and The Hotwives of Las Vegas.

In 2015, Gabrus was a contestant on the short internet game show from CollegeHumor “Um, Actually”. He also began hosting the podcast High and Mighty on Amir Blumenfeld and Jake Hurwitz's HeadGum network. He appears frequently on the podcasts improv4humans and Comedy Bang! Bang! On the latter, he plays the character of Gino Lombardo, host Scott Aukerman's very thin intern. On September 25, 2015, it was reported that Gabrus would co-write a half-hour spy comedy for Fox with Paul Lieberstein and potentially star in the project.

Personal life
Gabrus has been with his wife Tiffany Gabrus since they first met each other while attending Marist. Together they have a Boston Terrier named Arthur. Gabrus is also a well known cannabis advocate. The plant has also been in part the inspiration for his podcast High and Mighty with Jon Gabrus.

Filmography

References

External links

Gabrus's podcast High and Mighty

1982 births
Living people
American male comedians
American podcasters
Male actors from New York (state)
American male film actors
American male television actors
21st-century American male actors
Comedians from New York (state)
People from Nassau County, New York
Upright Citizens Brigade Theater performers
21st-century American comedians